Henning Stille Berg (born 1 September 1969) is a Norwegian football manager and former player, who is the current manager of Cypriot First Division club Pafos FC.

His career lasted from 1988 to 2004, most notably in the Premier League where he won titles with both Blackburn Rovers and Manchester United, becoming the first player to win the Premier League with two different clubs. He also played in his native land for Vålerenga and Lillestrøm before finishing his career in the Scottish Premier League with Rangers. He was capped 100 times by Norway, scoring nine goals.

Berg became a manager in 2005 with Lyn and then Lillestrøm. He returned to Blackburn as manager in 2012, but was sacked after just 57 days in the post. In January 2014, he became the new coach of Legia Warsaw, with whom he won the Ekstraklasa and the Polish Cup. He then managed Videoton and Stabæk, before moving to Cyprus, where he managed Omonia, and led them to their first championship in over a decade. In June 2022, he was announced as the new coach of Pafos FC.

Club career
Born in Eidsvoll, Berg played for Vålerenga and Lillestrøm before coming to England. Blackburn Rovers manager Kenny Dalglish attended a match between England and Norway at Wembley on 14 October 1992 to scout Tore Pedersen, but Pedersen was injured during the match and replaced by Berg. Dalglish was so impressed with Berg that he later offered him a contract. Berg joined Blackburn in January 1993 for £400,000.

Berg made his debut for Blackburn on 2 February 1993, coming on as a substitute in a 2–1 Premier League home defeat to Crystal Palace. He soon made the right-back position his own in the Rovers side and played a vital role in Blackburn's successful title-winning season under manager Kenny Dalglish in 1994–95, missing only two games throughout the season. Also a competent centre-back, Berg's versatility and consistent performances for Blackburn earned him a move to Manchester United in 1997 for a fee of £5 million – at the time the joint-highest fee ever paid for a defender by a British club.

Berg had supported Manchester United as a boy and manager Alex Ferguson had first wanted to sign Berg for United nine years earlier when he was a teenager, but the move fell through because United could not obtain a work permit. Berg was a regular choice in the Manchester United line-up during the 1997–98 season, but the arrival of Jaap Stam in July 1998 meant he was restricted to just 16 Premier League appearances in 1998–99 as the team won the Treble of the Premier League, the FA Cup and the UEFA Champions League. Berg missed the 1999 FA Cup Final and the 1999 UEFA Champions League Final through injury, but still picked up a medal for both, having been involved in most of the team's matches on the way to the final. With the league title in 1999, Berg became the first player to win the Premier League with two clubs, a feat he would be alone with until 2010, when it was matched by Ashley Cole and Nicolas Anelka. Gael Clichy, Kolo Touré, Carlos Tevez, Robert Huth, James Milner, N'Golo Kanté and Riyad Mahrez have all since matched the feat as well. Berg regained his place in the side during the 1999–2000 season, when Ronny Johnsen was injured.

Berg rejoined Blackburn Rovers in September 2000, initially on loan for three months, before securing a permanent transfer under manager Graeme Souness. Rovers were promoted back to the Premier League in 2000–01. Further success followed for Berg in the following season, when Blackburn won the League Cup, beating Tottenham Hotspur 2–1 at the Millennium Stadium in Cardiff, with Berg lifting the trophy as captain.

Berg later moved on from Blackburn and had a season at the Scottish club Rangers in 2003–04, where he played his last game professionally.

International career
At international level, Berg was part of the Norwegian national team at the 1994 and 1998 FIFA World Cups, as well as Euro 2000. He made his debut for Norway in a friendly against the Faroe Islands in May 1992 and earned a total of 100 caps over a period of 12 years, scoring nine goals. His final international match was a friendly against Wales in May 2004, in which he was substituted early on by Claus Lundekvam to mark the end of his Norway career.

Managerial career

Lyn
On 22 April 2005, Berg was appointed manager of Lyn at the age of 35, signing a four-year contract with the Oslo side. His first game with Lyn was against Start two days later, getting a 1–1 draw, followed by a 6–1 win against Molde the next week. Lyn finished third that season.

Lillestrøm
On 19 August 2008, Lyn announced that Berg had accepted an offer from Lillestrøm, where he had last played in 1992. He signed a five-year contract and took over as head coach on 21 October 2008. On 27 October 2011, Berg was sacked three matches before the end of the season as investor Per Berg promised fresh funds for acquiring quality players after the season.

Blackburn Rovers
While working as a pundit for Norwegian TV, Berg had made a withering assessment of Blackburn Rovers' owners, Venky's. He said: "There are no real managers with credibility who would accept a job like that." On 31 October 2012, Blackburn Rovers announced that Berg had accepted an offer for a three-year contract to manage the club. He became Blackburn's first foreign manager. Berg said of his previous comments about the club's owners, Venky's: "That was me looking at it from the outside without knowing really what was going on in the inside. I think this club at the moment is going in the right direction."

Berg's first match in charge of Blackburn came on 3 November 2012, a 2–0 defeat away to Crystal Palace. His first and only win was on 17 November 2012, a 4–1 victory away to Peterborough. That was to prove to be his only win as Blackburn manager, as Berg was sacked on 27 December, after just 57 days in the post.

On 14 February 2013, the LMA lodged legal proceedings to the high court against Blackburn Rovers for non-payment of wages to Berg.

After leaving Blackburn Rovers, Berg has worked as a scout on an informal basis for Norwich City, looking at matches in both England and Germany.

Legia Warsaw
On 19 December 2013, it was announced that he will be new manager of Legia Warsaw starting from 1 January 2014. In his first full season as coach, he led the team to the Polish Ekstraklasa title. On 5 October 2015, he was sacked while sitting second in the league, following a 2–2 draw against Górnik Zabrze.

Videoton
On 5 May 2016, Berg signed a two-year contract with Székesfehérvár-based Hungarian League club Videoton FC. He was sacked at the end of the season despite having been a contender for the title until the last matchday.

Omonia
On 6 June 2019, Berg signed a two-year contract with Omonia FC in Cyprus, which he would later renew for another year.

Berg was responsible for Omonia's return to the Champions League, as they were ranked first in the domestic league when the 2019–20 season was abandoned due to the COVID-19 pandemic. The following year, he led Omonia to win the 2020–21 Cypriot First Division, their first in 11 years, as well as the Super Cup. Although he led Omonia to the 2020–21 UEFA Europa League group stage (the first time the club had made it to a European group stage) and the 2021–22 UEFA Europa Conference League group stage, a dismal 2021–22 league campaign that saw the club out of the top six meant he was released on 28 February 2022.

Berg's work at Omonia was widely praised by pundits, fans and even other managers in the league, not only for restoring success to the club, but for his tactics, the team's exceptional defense, and most importantly, for trusting the local talent in a league notorious for its high percentage of foreign players. Several Cypriot players broke through under Berg, including Loizos Loizou, Marinos Tzionis and Ioannis Kousoulos.

Pafos FC 
On 12 June 2022, Berg joined Cypriot club Pafos FC as their new head coach.

Career statistics

Club

Managerial

Honours

As a player
Blackburn Rovers
 Premier League: 1994–95
 Football League Cup: 2001–02

Manchester United
 Premier League: 1998–99, 1999–2000

Individual
 Kniksen's Honour Award: 2004
 PFA Team of the Year: 2000–01 First Division

As a manager
Legia Warsaw
 Ekstraklasa: 2013–14, Runner-Up 2014–15
 Polish Cup: 2014–15

Omonia Nicosia
 Cypriot First Division: 2020–21
 Cypriot Super Cup: 2021

See also
 List of men's footballers with 100 or more international caps

References

External links
 
 Stats at LynFotball.net
 

1969 births
Living people
People from Eidsvoll
1994 FIFA World Cup players
1998 FIFA World Cup players
Blackburn Rovers F.C. players
FIFA Century Club
Kniksen Award winners
Lillestrøm SK players
Manchester United F.C. players
Norway international footballers
Norway youth international footballers
Norway under-21 international footballers
Expatriate footballers in England
Expatriate footballers in Scotland
Norwegian footballers
Norwegian football managers
Eliteserien players
Premier League players
Rangers F.C. players
Scottish Premier League players
UEFA Euro 2000 players
Vålerenga Fotball players
KFUM-Kameratene Oslo players
Norwegian expatriate footballers
Lyn Fotball managers
Lillestrøm SK managers
Blackburn Rovers F.C. managers
Legia Warsaw managers
Fehérvár FC managers
Stabæk Fotball managers
AC Omonia managers
Expatriate football managers in Cyprus
Expatriate football managers in England
Expatriate football managers in Hungary
Expatriate football managers in Poland
Norwegian expatriate sportspeople in Cyprus
Norwegian expatriate sportspeople in England
Norwegian expatriate sportspeople in Hungary
Norwegian expatriate sportspeople in Poland
Norwegian expatriate sportspeople in Scotland
Norwegian expatriate football managers
Association football defenders
UEFA Champions League winning players
Eliteserien managers
Nemzeti Bajnokság I managers
Sportspeople from Viken (county)